Soorakkottai is a village in the Thanjavur taluk of Thanjavur district, Tamil Nadu, India. It is the birth place of the famous Tamil actor thiru sivaji ganesan.

Demographics 

As per the 2001 census, Soorakkottai had a total population of 4304 with 2182 males and 2122 females. The sex ratio was 97.3. The literacy rate was 73.6.

References 

 

Villages in Thanjavur district